Peter Mytrofanovych Kravchenko (21 June 1921 - 27 November 2009) was a Ukrainian artist and public figure.

Biography 
Peter Kravchenko was born on 21 June 1921, in Podil, Kyiv, to a hard-working family. His father, Mitrofan Hryhorovych, had a small ice cream operation in the summer season, and in the fall he engaged in glass production. In 1940 Kravchenko graduated from Taras Shevchenko State Art School in Kyiv. During the war he was a German prisoner. After the Second World War he remained in Germany, where he worked as a set designer. In 1949 he went to Australia and settled in Sydney. After the end of the state employment contract at the brick factory, he worked on the railway. During this work he continued his professional education, graduated from the Institute of Commercial Arts and the School of Television Training.

He became involved in Ukrainian social and cultural life, designed scenes for performances and concerts. He designed a large number of artistic programs for various national awards and concerts, as well as a diploma of the  Australian Federation of Ukrainian Organisations and the award of the Foundation for Ukrainian Studies in Australia (FUSA). He also illustrated books.

He worked at the State Television Studio (ABC-TV) as a "props designer" at the costume department for 20 years.

In 1967 he was one of the founders of the Ukrainian Artists Society of Australia, and he was the acting secretary from 1967 to 2007. In 1975 he was one of the founders of FUSA in Australia and a permanent member. In 1991-1998 he belonged to the Directorate of this institution.

Art 
Kravchenko exhibited his paintings at Ukrainian Artists Society of Australia exhibitions in Lidcombe, Wollongong, Sydney, Adelaide, and Melbourne. In 1992, a solo exhibition was held in Sydney, showing 65 of his works. In the same year he was an exhibitor with his three works: "On Ivan Kupala", "Pereyaslivska Rada", and "Princess Olga" at the exhibition "Unity" in Kyiv. One work - "My Thoughts" (portrait of Taras Shevchenko) was donated and exhibited at the Taras Shevchenko National Museum. In 1994 he was accepted as an honorary member of the National Union of Artists of Ukraine, and in 1997 a personal exhibition "Burden of Ukraine through the Ages" was organized at the Museum of History of Kyiv, dedicated to the 2nd World Forum of Ukrainians. In 1999, the first album of the artist "The burden of Ukraine through the ages" was released, which presents 65 samples of Ukrainian costumes (clothes) worn by Ukrainian people.

Social activities 

Kravchenko was an honorary member of the International Charitable Foundation "Spiritual Heritage" (Kyiv) and an accredited correspondent of the newspaper "The Free Thought." He was awarded diplomas and medals from the Australian Federation of Ukrainian Organisations, from the Union for the Liberation of Ukraine, the Gold Medal "For Patronage" of the International Charitable Foundation "Ukrainian House" (Kyiv), others from the International Charitable Foundation "Spiritual Heritage" and the Ukrainian Orthodox Church Certificate of Merit in Australia, Ukrainian Community Sydney.

In 1996 he organized an exhibition in Kyiv dedicated to the 150th anniversary of Nicholas Miklouho-Maclay and initiated the issuance of a postage stamp by Ukrposhta dedicated to the 150th anniversary of Nicholas Miklouho-Maclay. In 1998, thanks to his efforts, Ukrposhta issued a postage stamp dedicated to the 50th anniversary of the Ukrainian settlement in Australia. In 2000, he organized the arrival of a delegation of the Kyiv City Council to establish cultural relations between the cities of Kyiv and Sydney and to bring a sculpture-monument "Shevchenko's Dumas" as a gift to Ukrainians in Sydney from Ukraine.

He was awarded the Diploma of the Ministry of Culture and Arts of Ukraine (2003).

References

Sources and further reading 
 Винниченко Ігор. Кравченко Петро Митрофанович // Енциклопедія історії України : у 10 т. / редкол.: В. А. Смолій (голова) та ін. ; Інститут історії України НАН України. — К. : Наукова думка, 2009. — Т. 5 : Кон — Кю. — С. 274. — 560 с. : іл. — .
 Рудаков Микола. Щоб не порвалась історії нитка... // Урядовий кур'єр: газета.1999,15 липня. С.16
 Рудаков Микола. Українці діаспори дарують. // Урядовий кур'єр: газета.2001,13 квітня. С.16
 Наказ Міністерства культури і мистецтв України No. 485-к від 17.07.2003 р.

1921 births
2009 deaths
Ukrainian painters
Ukrainian printmakers
Australian printmakers
Australian painters
Shevchenko State Art School alumni
Soviet prisoners of war
World War II prisoners of war held by Germany